The Life Party is a political party in the Republic of the Congo. In the parliamentary election held on 24 June and 5 August 2007, the party won 1 out of 137 seats.

References 

Political parties in the Republic of the Congo